Albakil "Thong" Dasani Jikiri is a Moro Filipino who is a member of the Bangsamoro Transition Authority Parliament and the Deputy Chief Minister of Bangsamoro for the Islands.

Early life and education
Albakil Jikiri was born in December 12, 1980 in Indanan, Sulu to Yusop Jikiri and Dayang Dayang Harija Dasani. He used the Dasani as his last name for security reason during his elementary school years in Bakud Elementary School in Jolo due to his father's association with the Moro National Liberation Front (MNLF). After the 1996 Final Peace Agreement was signed between the Philippine government and the MNLF, he began using his paternal family name. By this time he is already attending high school at the Notre Dame High School for Boys in Jolo. He obtained a bachelor's degree in Political science at the Universidad de Zamboanga.

Career

Moro National Liberation Front
Jikiri is the son of Yusop Jikiri who is chairman of a faction within the Moro National Liberation Front. In January 2021, few months after his father's death, he was designatied as MNLF National Vice Chairman for Military Affairs. The faction expressed support to the presidential campaign of Bongbong Marcos for the 2022 elections.

Sulu government
Jikiri is elected as a member of the Sulu provincial board in 2007 and municipal councilor of Indanan in 2013.

Bangsamoro government
Jikiri would be appointed to the Bangsamoro Transition Authority Parliament by President Rodrigo Duterte on September 23, 2021 to fill in the seat of parliament member Abdul Sahrin who died in office. In December 1, 2021, he was named as Deputy Chief Minister of Bangsamoro for the Islands filling in the position which was also held by Sahrin.

References

1980 births
Members of the Bangsamoro Transition Authority Parliament
Moro National Liberation Front members
Politicians from Sulu
Living people